The 2012 Internationaux Féminins de la Vienne was a professional tennis tournament played on indoor hard courts. It was the sixteenth edition of the tournament which was part of the 2012 ITF Women's Circuit. It took place in Poitiers, France on 22–28 October 2012.

WTA entrants

Seeds 

 1 Rankings are as of 15 October 2012.

Other entrants 
The following players received wildcards into the singles main draw:
  Julie Coin
  Alizé Cornet
  Myrtille Georges
  Aravane Rezaï

The following players received entry from the qualifying draw:
  Catalina Castaño
  Mădălina Gojnea
  Elitsa Kostova
  Anna Karolína Schmiedlová

Champions

Singles 

  Monica Puig def.  Elena Vesnina, 7–5, 1–6, 7–5

Doubles 

  Catalina Castaño /  Mervana Jugić-Salkić def.  Stéphanie Foretz Gacon /  Tatjana Malek, 6–4, 5–7, [10–4]

External links 
 2012 Internationaux Féminins de la Vienne at ITFTennis.com
 Official website

Internationaux Feminins de la Vienne
Internationaux Féminins de la Vienne
October 2012 sports events in France
2012 in French tennis